Richard Juuko Kasagga (born 4 July 1993) is a Ugandan professional footballer who plays as a defender for Olympique Béja in the Tunisian Ligue Professionnelle 1 and the Uganda national team.

Club career

Earlier career
Kasagga began his senior club career in Uganda Premier League side Kiira Young FC in 2013 where he played until 2015.

Salam Zgharta
He later moved to Lebanese Premier League club Salam Zgharta and appeared in 20 league matches, scoring 1 goal. He has also played in 7 AFC Cup games for the Lebanese outfit.

Back to Uganda
In 2016, he signed with Ugandan heavyweights Kampala City Authority where he played for two seasons before moving to Uganda Revenue Authority SC. Kasagga appeared in Uganda Premier League with URA from 2017 to 2018.

Aizawl FC
Kasagga made his debut in India, playing for Aizawl in the
I-League in 2018–19 season. He appeared in 10 league matches in that season. In 2020, he renewed his contract with the Mizoram-based side. He played 13 matches in the 2019–20 season and 3 matches in 2020–21 season. On 24 January 2021, he scored his first goal for Aizawl against Indian Arrows in a 1–1 draw match.

International career
Kasagga debuted for Uganda national football team on 13 July 2013 against Tanzania in a 2014 African Nations Championship second round match.

In January 2014, coach Milutin Sredojević, invited him to be included in the Uganda national football team for the 2014 African Nations Championship. The team placed third in the group stage of the competition after beating Burkina Faso, drawing with Zimbabwe and losing to Morocco.

He represented his country for 37 times including matches in bigger competitions like 2016 African Nations Championship and CECAFA Senior Challenge Cup.

Personal life
Kasagga was born in Lyantonde and besides football, he has competed B.Sc in Construction Management from Makerere University.

Career statistics

Club

International

Honours
Kampala Capital City
Uganda Premier League: 2015–16
Aizawl
Mizoram Premier League: 2019–20

References

External links
 Richard Kasagga player profile at Eurosport.com
 

Living people
Uganda A' international footballers
2014 African Nations Championship players
Ugandan footballers
1993 births
Expatriate footballers in India
Association football defenders
Uganda international footballers
Kiira Young FC players
Expatriate footballers in Lebanon
Ugandan expatriate footballers
Salam Zgharta FC players
Aizawl FC players
Expatriate footballers in Tunisia
Olympique Béja players
Ugandan expatriate sportspeople in India
Ugandan expatriate sportspeople in Tunisia
Ugandan expatriate sportspeople in Lebanon
Lebanese Premier League players